Khaqani Park or Boostan Khaqani is a small park in Tabriz, located between the Azerbaijan Museum and the Blue mosque. The park is named after the 12th century Persian Poet Khaqani Shirvani, who died in Tabriz.

Photo gallery

See also
 Khaqani 
 Tabriz
 Shah-goli

References 

 City of Tabriz on Iran Chamber Society (www.iranchamber.com)
  Editorial Board, East Azarbaijan Geography, Iranian Ministry of Education, 2000 (High School Text Book in Persian)
 https://web.archive.org/web/20070216155119/http://www.tabrizcity.org/

Parks in Tabriz